Britten Motorcycle Company is a Christchurch, New Zealand motorcycle manufacturer created by John Britten in 1992.  The Britten V1000 motorcycles were unusual for their heavy use of carbon fibre for the fairing, wheels and swingarm.  Britten motorcycles had no chassis in the traditional sense.  Instead, the engine behaved as a stressed member of the chassis and each end of the motorcycle was bolted to it.

External links
 Official web site

Motorcycle manufacturers of New Zealand
Motorcycles by brand
Vehicle manufacturing companies established in 1992
New Zealand companies established in 1992